The following is a complete Nuclear Death discography.

Wake Me When I'm Dead EP (1986)
Wake Me When I'm Dead was the band's first cassette-demo release, released in 1986.

 "Shrieking Terror" 
 "The Seventh Nun" 
 "Cock Jaw" 
 "Rigor Mortis" 
 "Nuclear Death"

Welcome to the Minds of the Morbid EP (1987)
 "Necrobestiality"
 "Cremation"
 "The Third Antichrist"
 "On Behalf the Beast"

Vultures Feeding EP (1988)
Vultures Feeding was the band's third release.

 "Corpse of Allegiance"
 "Prolong the Agony" 
 "The Colour of Blood" 
 "Vultures Feeding"

A Symphony of Agony EP (1988)
This release was released on Reh Tape Records.

Caveat (1988)
This release, their debut album, was released cassette-only.

 "Necrobestiality" 
 "Cremation" 
 "The Third Antichrist"
 "One Behalf the Beast" 
 "Corpse of Allegiance" 
 "Prolong the Agony" 
 "The Colour of Blood" 
 "Vultures Feeding"

Bride of Insect (1990)
Although previous album Caveat was a full-length release, Bride of Insect is often regarded as their first album because it was their first released by the Wild Rags label, and their first to be recorded in a studio.  Bride of Insect was reissued in 2000 on a single CD along with the album's follow-up Carrion for Worm (1992).

 "Necrobestiality" – 2:15
 "Corpse of Allegiance" – 1:47
 "Feral Viscera" – 0:57
 "Stygian Tranquility" – 3:05
 "Place of Skulls" – 2:27
 "Cremation" – 3:08
 "The Colour of Blood" – 2:06
 "The Beloved Whore Celebration" – 2:02
 "Fetal Lament: Homesick" – 4:36
 "Bride of Insect" – 2:42
 "The Misshapen Horror" – 2:33
 "Vultures Feeding" – 1:22

Carrion for Worm (1991)
In 2000, this album was reissued on a single CD with its predecessor Bride of Insect (1990).

 "Spawn Song" – (1:45)
 "The Human Seed" – (1:19)
 "Proposing to the Impaled" – (3:03)
 "Moribund" – (1:56)
 "Greenflies" – (3:13)
 "Return of the Feasting Witch" – (2:32)
 "A Dark Country" – (3:01)
 "Lurker in the Closet: A 'Fairy' Tale" – (1:41)
 "Cathedral of Sleep" – (2:37)
 "Homage to Morpheus" – (1:33)
 "Carrion for Worm" – (1:20)
 "Vampirism" – (2:10)

For Our Dead EP (1992)
This 1992 EP was released on vinyl and cassette. It was the band's last release through Wild Rags Records. The EP was reissued in 2000 on a single CD with All Creatures Great and Eaten (1992).

 "The Corpse Tree"
 "Days of the Weak"
 "The Third Antichrist"
 "The Church of Evil Minds of Splatterday Saints"

All Creatures Great and Eaten (1992)
This album was edited only on tape. In 2000, it was reissued on CD by Extremist Records, combined with For Our Dead (1992). This is the first release without original guitarist Phil Hampson, as Lori Bravo and Steve Cowan took over guitar duties.

 "Bones of the Lip" 
 "The Art of Veins" 
 "Mindbleeder" 
 "Divine Perversion" 
 "Guinea Man" 
 "Aunt Farm" 
 "A Dark Winter Psalm" 
 "All Creatures Great and Eaten"

The Planet Cachexial (1996)
Released on Cat's Meow Records in 1996, Nuclear Death discarded the fast-paced frantic bestiality of previous releases in favor of a mostly instrumental attack of deranged ambient music

 "Cachexial" (Part 1: Cachexial, My Home Prison/Part 2: Ferrago, Guardians To Mother/Part 3: Mother Chaos) 
 "Raped By the Wiengd" (Part 1: The Wiengd Appears/Part 2: Aurora Be She/Part 3: The Conceivement of Slumberblood) 
 "Birthing of Slumberblood" 
 "Grimalkin Be Spoiled" 
 "The Ground Hath Noses" 
 "Ve' At" 
 "Into Zyrèlyà" 
 "Oh Father Death, Taketh Me!" 
 "Wardance" (Part 1: Ugly...Kill It!/Part 2: Children Must Die!) 
 "Tis Ne'r Over 'Til the Fat Thing Screams" 
 "Amanuensis To Basiliscus Pente"

Harmony Drinks of Me (2000)
This was the band's final album, featuring gothic, folk, techno and industrial overtones, released on Cat's Meow Records.

 "Electric Spaceboy" 
 "Eyes Closed (The Sin)" 
 "Sunless"
 "The Baths" 
 "Strident"
 "Shoot" 
 "Haunted Man-Nimbus"

Heavy metal group discographies

Discographies of American artists